Amphidromus globonevilli is a species of air-breathing land snail, a terrestrial pulmonate gastropod mollusk in the family Camaenidae.

Distribution
Distribution of Amphidromus globonevilli include Tak Province in the western Thailand and Chittagong, Bangladesh.

Description

References

External links 

globonevilli
Gastropods described in 2015